Maria Coburn (born November 22, 2001) is an American diver. She competed in the women's 1 metre springboard event at the 2019 World Aquatics Championships.

References

External links
 

2001 births
Living people
American female divers
Place of birth missing (living people)
21st-century American women